Captain Sir James Huey Hamill Pollock,  (1893–14 March 1982), also known as Shamus Pollock, was a British colonial administrator and unionist politician in Northern Ireland.

Pollock studied at the Royal School, Armagh and the University of Leeds. During the First World War he served as a Lieutenant, Captain, and Major in the 7th Royal Irish Rifles. He then joined the Colonial Service, spending many years in British Palestine, including service as District Officer in Ramallah and District Commissioner for Jerusalem.

He retired in 1953, and was immediately elected an Ulster Unionist Party member of the Senate of Northern Ireland, serving until 1956.

References

1893 births
1982 deaths
Members of the Senate of Northern Ireland 1953–1957
People educated at The Royal School, Armagh
Ulster Unionist Party members of the Senate of Northern Ireland
Knights of the Order of St John
Officers of the Order of the British Empire
Companions of the Order of St Michael and St George
People from Ballymoney